The 1988 Chilean national plebiscite was a presidential election in form, but not in name, as it was officially referred to as a national referendum. Held on October 5, 1988, the plebiscite aimed to determine if Augusto Pinochet, the head of a military dictatorship, should become President for eight years under resumed civilian rule. The "No" side won with 56% of the vote, marking the end of Pinochet's rule of 16 and a half years. Democratic elections were held in 1989, leading to the establishment of a new government in 1990.

Although Pinochet was disappointed with the results, he respected them due to pressure from international and business communities, as well as from Pope John Paul II who advocated for a more democratic Chile.

Background
On September 11 1973, General Augusto Pinochet and leaders of the Air Force, Navy, and police force staged a coup d'état that deposed the democratically elected Socialist President Salvador Allende. Allende committed suicide as the presidential palace was being bombarded. A military junta, led by Pinochet, Air Force General Gustavo Leigh, Navy Admiral José Toribio Merino, and Carabinero Chief General César Mendoza, was established on the same evening. The following day, the four leaders drafted an official document that suspended the 1925 constitution and Congress, making the junta the supreme authority in the country. Pinochet was designated as its first president, and the four agreed to rotate the office. However, an advisory committee, staffed by army officers loyal to Pinochet, recommended abandoning the rotating presidency due to administrative and confusion issues. In March 1974, Pinochet attacked the Christian Democratic Party and stated that there was no set timetable for a return to civilian rule. In December 1974, he was declared the Supreme Leader of the nation. The junta functioned as a legislative body until democracy was restored in 1990.

On September 24, 1973, the junta set up a commission to create a blueprint for a new constitution. By October 5, 1978, the commission had completed its work. The proposal was studied by the Council of State, presided by former president Jorge Alessandri, and was submitted to Pinochet and the junta in July 1980. A constitutional referendum took place on September 11, 1980, and the new constitution was approved by 67% of voters, though the referendum was criticized for irregularities and fraud. The Constitution took effect on March 11, 1981 and established a "transition period" in which Pinochet would continue to hold executive power and the junta legislative power for eight years. Before the end of that period, a candidate for President was to be proposed by the Commanders-in-Chief of the Armed Forces and Carabinero Chief General and ratified by registered voters in a national plebiscite. In August 1988, Pinochet was declared the candidate.

During the final years of the dictatorship, the commanders-in-chief of the Navy, Air Force, and Carabineros distanced themselves from Pinochet and expressed their wish that a civilian represent the regime in the 1988 plebiscite. However, Pinochet imposed himself as the candidate.

Plebiscite

The plebiscite – as detailed in the 1980 Constitution – consisted of two choices:

Yes: The proposed candidate is approved. Pinochet takes office on 11 March 1989 for an eight-year mandate, and parliamentary elections are held nine months after he is sworn in. The Junta continues to exercise legislative power until the newly elected Congress takes office on 11 March 1990.
No: The proposed candidate is rejected. Pinochet and the Junta continue in power for another year and a half. Presidential and parliamentary elections are held three months before Pinochet's term expires. The newly elected President and Congress take office on 11 March 1990.

Political endorsements

Yes
 Democratic Party of Chile
 Great Civic Front of Chile
  Independent Democratic Union
  Liberal Democrat Party of Chile
  National Advance
  National Party
  National Renewal
  Radical Democracy
  Social Democrat Party
  Party of the South

No
  Christian Democratic Party
  Christian Left
  Communist Party of Chile
  Humanist Party
  Liberal Party
  MAPU Obrero Campesino
 National Democratic Party
  National Party for the NO
  Party for Democracy
  Popular Socialist Union
  Popular Unitary Action Movement
  Radical Party
  Revolutionary Left Movement
 Social Democracy Party of Chile
 Democratic Socialist Radical Party
  Socialist Party of Chile (Almeyda faction)
  Socialist Party of Chile (Historic faction)
  Socialist Party of Chile (Mandujano faction)
  Socialist Party of Chile (Núñez faction)
  The Greens

Null vote
  Chilean Socialist Party  A populist party created by pro-Junta factions to attract support for Pinochet disguised under the Socialist Party's banner.

The campaign

The campaign is regarded, along with the registration process, as one of the key factors that led to the victory of the No side in the plebiscite.

For the first time in the history of Chile, both options were guaranteed free electoral advertising spaces—franjas—of 15 minutes each, late at night or early in the morning. (There were similar spaces in prime time, but only for the government). They were first broadcast on 5 September, at 11 pm, just one month before the referendum.
In a short time the spots prepared by the No side were seen to be better, despite the Yes side creating a more elaborate campaign devised by an Argentinian advertising agency and with the assistance of the Chilean Armed Forces. The Minister of the Interior Sergio Fernández, one of the main coordinators of the official campaign, said:

The No side used a rainbow as its main symbol, with the intention of symbolising the plural views of the opposition (each member party had its own colour depicted in the rainbow) and, at the same time, the hope of a better Chile and a more prosperous future. Their campaign, directed by American and Chilean advertising men, combined both criticism (including testimony by victims of torture and relatives of disappeared people during the dictatorship) and optimism, highlighting that the No option did not mean returning to the socialist system of former President Salvador Allende, but the re-establishment of democracy. This idea was supported by the appearance of right-wing leaders standing for No. A popular jingle was composed, with the main slogan of the campaign, "Chile, la alegría ya viene" (Chile, joy is on its way), and both Chilean and international celebrities, such as Patricio Bañados (renowned journalist banned from TV by the Junta), Sting, Jane Fonda, Richard Dreyfuss, Sara Montiel, Robert Blake, Paloma San Basilio and Christopher Reeve starred in the No spots. One advert featured a middle-aged woman describing her experience of being kidnapped and tortured after the 1973 coup, and advocating a no vote, followed by her son Carlos Caszely, one of Chile's top footballers of the 1970s and 1980s, and a critic of the Pinochet regime.

The Yes campaign had two main goals: creating fear amongst voters by reminding them of the chaotic situation of Chile in 1973, with the consequent coup d'état (a background blamed on supporters of the No side), and improving the general perception of Augusto Pinochet, regarded by the public as an arrogant and authoritarian leader. The spots included jingles with lyrics supportive of the Junta and songs that were close to promoting a cult of personality around Pinochet, such as the main campaign anthem, "Un horizonte de esperanza" (A Horizon of Hope) or a Rapa Nui folk song, "Iorana, Presidente" (Hello, President). In its early stages the campaign put its focus on the economic success achieved by the government, but when this failed to appeal to viewers, the strategy followed was to introduce criticism of the No adverts and the publication of polls that showed massive support for Pinochet, and a new look of the programmes starting in the 18 September broadcast, with the new format almost identical to those of the No – a presenter, Hernán Serrano, introduced each topic, and more testimonies were added.

Both sides called for massive rallies: on 22 September the No side started the March of Joy (Marcha de la alegría), which lasted 10 days and joined supporters from the northernmost and southernmost cities of Chile in Santiago. These rallies were often stopped by the Carabineros or the secret police on claimed suspicion of possible attacks, or for no stated reason, and the demonstrators were attacked by armed pro-Yes supporters without the police taking any action. On 2 October the Yes campaign called for a huge rally in downtown Santiago. The rallies had different coverage by the news media, which struggled to show more Chileans standing for the Yes side than for the No, and were considered to be too close to the Yes campaign.

Electorate
Voting was open to persons who were aged 18 or over on the day of the election, and were either Chilean citizens or foreigners who had resided legally in Chile for at least five years. Only those registered in the electoral roll could vote, but registration was not compulsory. Voting was mandatory for registered Chilean citizens.

Results

Source: Tribunal Calificador de Elecciones.

Result by  regions

Aftermath
In the wake of his electoral defeat, Pinochet attempted to implement a plan for an auto-coup. He attempted to implement efforts to orchestrate chaos and violence in the streets to justify his power grab, however, the Carabinero police refused an order to lift the cordon against street demonstrations in the capital, according to a CIA informant. In his final move, Pinochet convened a meeting of his junta at La Moneda, in which he requested that they give him extraordinary powers to have the military seize the capital. Air Force General Fernando Matthei refused, saying that he would not agree to such a thing under any circumstances, and the rest of the junta followed this stance, on grounds that Pinochet already had his turn and lost. Matthei would later become the first member of the junta to publicly admit that Pinochet had lost the plebiscite. Without any support from the junta, Pinochet was forced to accept the result.

The other junta members, who had preferred a civilian to run for president instead of Pinochet, regarded the result as Pinochet's personal defeat.

Pinochet and opposition forces agreed to revise the 1980 Constitution. The 54 proposed amendments were approved by 91% of voters in a referendum on 30 July 1989. Presidential and parliamentary elections took place as scheduled on 14 December 1989. The opposition candidate, Christian Democrat Patricio Aylwin, won the election with 55% of the vote, and took office on 11 March 1990. The newly elected Congress was sworn in the same day.

Popular culture
The 2012 film No presented a fictionalized account of the "No" television campaign. It was the first Chilean film nominated for an Academy Award for Best Foreign Language Film at the 85th Academy Awards.

See also
Chilean transition to democracy

Further reading
Ethan Kaplan, Fernando Saltiel, Sergio S. Urzúa. 2019. "Voting for Democracy: Chile's Plebiscito and the Electoral Participation of a Generation." NBER.

References

External links
El plebiscito presidencial de 1988 National Democratic Institute 

Chile
Single-candidate elections
Referendums in Chile
1988 in Chile
Military dictatorship of Chile (1973–1990)
October 1988 events in South America